Romagne may refer to several places in France:

 Romagne, Gironde, a commune in the Gironde department
 Romagné, a commune in the Ille-et-Vilaine department
 Romagne, Vienne, a commune in the Vienne department
 Romagne-sous-les-Côtes, a commune in the Meuse department
 Romagne-sous-Montfaucon, a commune in the Meuse department
 La Romagne, Ardennes, a commune in the Ardennes department
 La Romagne, Maine-et-Loire, a commune in the Maine-et-Loire department

See also
 Romagna, a historical region of Italy whose French name is Romagne